Kamensky (masculine), Kamenskaya (feminine), or Kamenskoye (neuter) may refer to:

People
Kamensky (surname) (fem. Kamenskaya)

Places
Kamensky District, name of several districts in Russia
Kamensky Okrug, name of various divisions in Russia
Kamensky (inhabited locality) (Kamenskaya, Kamenskoye), several inhabited localities in Russia
Kamenskoye Urban Settlement, several municipal urban settlements in Russia
Kamianske (Kamenskoye), a city in Ukraine

Other
Kamenskaya (TV series), Russian TV series based on the novels by Alexandra Marinina

See also
Kamensk, several inhabited localities in Russia
 Kamenski Vučjak
 Kamenskoye Plato